

110001–110100 

|-id=026
| 110026 Hamill ||  || Mark Hamill (born 1951) is an American actor most famous for playing Luke Skywalker in the Star Wars films. Hamill has won acclaim as a voice actor, most notably as the Joker, Batman's archenemy. Hamill has appeared in more than 75 films, hundreds of television episodes, and more than 30 video games. || 
|-id=073
| 110073 Leeonki ||  || Lee On-ki (born 1994), student at Shun Tak Fraternal Association Yung Ya College || 
|-id=074
| 110074 Lamchunhei ||  || Lam Chun Hei (born 1991), student at Shun Tak Fraternal Association Yung Ya College in Hong Kong || 
|-id=077
| 110077 Pujiquanshan ||  || Pujiquanshan is the motto of the charitable organization,  Sik Sik Yuen, founded in Hong Kong in 1965. "Pujiquanshan" means "Act benevolently and teach benevolence". || 
|}

110101–110200 

|-bgcolor=#f2f2f2
| colspan=4 align=center | 
|}

110201–110300 

|-id=288
| 110288 Libai ||  || Li Bai (AD 701–762), Chinese poet, member of the group of scholars known as the "Eight Immortals of the Wine Cup" in a poem by fellow poet Du Fu (see 110289) || 
|-id=289
| 110289 Dufu ||  || Du Fu (AD 712 – 770), Chinese poet, one of the greatest along with Li Bai (see above) || 
|-id=293
| 110293 Oia ||  || Oia, a small town on the Greek island of Santorini, in the south Aegean Sea. || 
|-id=294
| 110294 Victoriaharbour ||  || Victoria Harbour, a natural harbor located between Hong Kong Island to the south and Kowloon to the North. || 
|-id=295
| 110295 Elcalafate ||  || El Calafate, a city in Patagonia, Argentina. || 
|-id=296
| 110296 Luxor ||  || The city of Luxor in Egypt, famous for the ruins of its many temples, monuments and tombs, as well as for the nearby Valley of the Kings and Valley of the Queens. || 
|-id=297
| 110297 Yellowriver ||  || The Yellow River in China is the sixth-longest river in the world with an estimated length of 5,464 km. || 
|-id=298
| 110298 Deceptionisland ||  || Deception Island, the caldera of an active volcanic island off the Antarctic Peninsula. || 
|-id=299
| 110299 Iceland ||  || Iceland is a volcanically and geologically active island in the North Atlantic Ocean. With an area of 103,000 square kilometer and population of about 330,000, it is the most sparsely populated country in Europe. || 
|-id=300
| 110300 Abusimbel ||  || The Abu Simbel temples near Abu Simbel on the upper Nile River in southern Egypt || 
|}

110301–110400 

|-id=393
| 110393 Rammstein ||  || Rammstein, a German hard rock-metal group from Eastern Germany, named in turn after the city of Ramstein-Miesenbach where the 1988 air show disaster occurred † || 
|}

110401–110500 

|-id=404
| 110404 Itoemi ||  || Emi Ito (1941–2012), born Hideyo Ito, was a popular Japanese singer from the late 1950s to the mid 1970s. Together with her identical twin sister, Yumi Ito, they became internationally famous as "The Peanuts". The sisters are perhaps best remembered as the "Mothra fairies" in the first three Mothra movies. || 
|-id=405
| 110405 Itoyumi ||  || Yumi Ito (1941–2016), born Tsukiko Ito, was a popular Japanese singer from the late 1950s to the mid 1970s. Together with her identical twin sister, Emi Ito, they became internationally famous as "The Peanuts". The sisters are perhaps best remembered as the "Mothra fairies" in the first three Mothra movies. || 
|-id=408
| 110408 Nakajima ||  || Haruo Nakajima (1929–2017) was a Japanese stunt actor who appeared in films such as Akira Kurosawa's Seven Samurai. Best known as "the man in the suit", Nakajima portrayed Gojira (Godzilla) and other kaiju (fantastic creatures) in 21 movies from Gojira (1954) to Chikyu Kogeki Meirei: Gojira tai Gaigan (1972). || 
|-id=416
| 110416 Cardille ||  || Bill Cardille (1928–2016) was a television broadcast personality in Pittsburgh. Starting in 1957, he hosted many programs on WIIC-TV (later WPXI), including Studio Wrestling and a 20-year run on Chiller Theatre. Cardille also appeared in several movies, including Night of the Living Dead. || 
|}

110501–110600 

|-bgcolor=#f2f2f2
| colspan=4 align=center | 
|}

110601–110700 

|-bgcolor=#f2f2f2
| colspan=4 align=center | 
|}

110701–110800 

|-id=702
| 110702 Titostagno ||  || Tito Stagno (1930-2022) was an Italian TV journalist. As a reporter, he followed the whole series of Apollo missions and in 1969 made live commentary of the landing of the first man on the Moon. Name suggested by M. Morelli and M. Di Martino. || 
|-id=742
| 110742 Tetuokudo ||  || Tetuo Kudo (born 1958), staff member of the Goshi Municipal Office and a renowned amateur astronomer || 
|-id=743
| 110743 Hirobumi ||  || Itō Hirobumi (1841–1909), a Japanese statesman who greatly contributed to the modernization of the Japanese political system || 
|}

110801–110900 

|-bgcolor=#f2f2f2
| colspan=4 align=center | 
|}

110901–111000 

|-bgcolor=#f2f2f2
| colspan=4 align=center | 
|}

References 

110001-111000